Caroline Weber may refer to:

Caroline Weber (author) (born 1969), American historian
Caroline Weber (gymnast) (born 1986), Austrian rhythmic gymnast